Hastings Beer and Music Festival is a four-day event that takes place at The Oval, Hastings. It is managed by a committee made up of members of the local Hastings Round Table (club).

The Hastings Beer Festival started in 1981.

What started out as a small charity raising event offering a selection of ales became an event for Hastings and the surrounding areas with the money raised being donated to local causes.

In 1998 the event became the Hastings Beer and Music Festival. The size of the event increased over the years and resulted in a new concept to the way in which the event is organised and operated. As well as voluntary work offered by Round Table members past and present, their wives, the support of many other charitable organisations in the area this event continues to provide a form of entertainment for the town
In 2005, Hastings Beer and Music Festival upped the ante, with Keane, a local band from nearby Battle performing at the event. This raised a lot of money for the primary beneficiary - St. Michaels Hospice. Following the success of this format, the team at Hastings Beer and Music Festival opted for yet another big name headline act. Status Quo graced the stages as part of their 'the party ain't over yet...' tour in 2006 - supported by local band Zucchini.

After a slightly smaller event of tribute and local acts in 2007, the event was cancelled due to a lack of funding following a bad turnout to the 2007 event owing to the bad weather. However, after much Public support and outcry, mainly through Facebook, the committee re-formed and put together a "Back to Roots" event with big local bands all playing for free over two days.  Keane also performed at the 2012 festival.

In 2017, the HBMF committee decided that the event had outgrown its home in Alexandra Park and, after 35 years, were going to move it to a new venue at The Oval Playing Fields on Bohemia Road in Hastings.

References

External links
 Official Site

Hastings
Festivals in East Sussex